Cyathopsis albicans is a species of plant in the family Ericaceae, endemic to New Caledonia. It was first described as Leucopogon albicans in 1864 by Adolphe-Théodore Brongniart and Jean Antoine Arthur Gris, and transferred to Cyathopsis in 2005 by Christopher John Quinn.

References

Epacridoideae
Flora of New Caledonia